The Rangers 1895–96 season was the 22nd of competitive football in the Scottish Football Association.

Overview
Rangers played a total of 22 competitive matches during the 1895–96 season. They finished second in the Scottish League Division One with a record of 11 wins from 18 matches.

The club ended the season without the Scottish Cup after being knocked out in the quarter final stage by Hibernian by 3–2. The club had beaten Dumbarton and St Mirren during the competition.

Results
All results are written with Rangers' score first.

Scottish League Division One

Scottish Cup

Appearances

See also
 1895–96 in Scottish football
 1895–96 Scottish Cup

Rangers F.C. seasons
Ran